Dyatlov (from дятел meaning woodpecker) is a Russian masculine surname; its feminine counterpart is Dyatlova. People with the names include:

 Anatoly Dyatlov (1931–1995), Russian nuclear engineer
 Artem Dyatlov (born 1989), Uzbekistani hurdler
 Igor Dyatlov (1936–1959), leader of the group of students who died in the area of the Urals later named Dyatlov Pass
 Natalya Smirnitskaya (née Dyatlova; 1927–2004), Soviet javelin thrower

Russian-language surnames